Christopher Davis (born 1950) is an American writer. He is best known for his HIV/AIDS-themed novels Valley of the Shadow (1988), which was a shortlisted nominee for the Lambda Literary Award for Gay Fiction at the 1st Lambda Literary Awards in 1989, and Philadelphia (1994), a novelization of the 1993 drama film Philadelphia.

Davis also published the novel Joseph and the Old Man (1986), and the short story collection The Boys in the Bars (1989).

Davis released little biographical information about himself to the media, and did not publish any further work after Philadelphia.

References

1953 births
20th-century American novelists
American male novelists
American gay writers
American male short story writers
Living people
American LGBT novelists
20th-century American short story writers
20th-century American male writers
21st-century American LGBT people
20th-century American LGBT people